Myxine affinis, the Patagonian hagfish, is a species of jawless fish in the family Myxinidae.

It inhabits relatively shallow waters off the coast of Tierra del Fuego in southernmost Argentina and Chile. Despite its relatively restricted range, it is not thought to be at heavy risk due to a lack of fishing within its range, although crustacean trap fisheries have recently opened in the area. For this reason, it is considered a species of Least Concern on the IUCN Red List.

References

Myxinidae
Fauna of Tierra del Fuego
Fish described in 1870
Taxa named by Albert Günther